The Chiapas montane forests is a tropical moist broadleaf forest ecoregion in southern Mexico and extending into western Guatemala. It includes the montane tropical forests on the northern and northeastern slopes of the Chiapas Highlands.

Geography
The Chiapas montane forests lie on the northern and northeastern slopes of the Chiapas highlands, between the lowland Petén–Veracruz moist forests to the north and east and the Central American pine–oak forests in the higher mountains to the south.

Climate
The climate of the ecoregion is tropical and humid. The forests have a cooler climate than the adjacent lowlands, and average annual temperatures decrease with elevation.

Flora
The predominant plant community is mountain cloud forest. Characteristic tree species include majagua (Trichospermum mexicanum), American sweetgum (Liquidambar styraciflua) and alder (Alnus sp). There are approximately 98,050 hectares of primary forest, and 272,991 hectares of second-growth forest.

Fauna
Native animals include coyote (Canis latrans) and white-tailed deer (Odocoileus virginianus), mountain trogon (Trogon mexicanus), Steller's jay (Cyanocitta stelleri), Stuart's burrowing snake (Adelphicos veraepacis), and Godman's pit viper (Bothrops godmani).

Protected areas
A 2017 assessment found 273 km², or 5%, of the ecoregion is in protected areas. Protected areas include Nahá Flora and Fauna Protection Area, Montes Azules Biosphere Reserve, and Lagunas de Montebello National Park.

See also
 List of ecoregions in Mexico

External links

References

Chiapas Highlands
Ecoregions of Mexico
Ecoregions of Guatemala
Montane forests
Natural history of Chiapas
Neotropical tropical and subtropical moist broadleaf forests
 
Cloud forests of Mexico